Gwynn is a census-designated place (CDP) in Mathews County, Virginia, United States. The population as of the 2010 Census was 602. Gwynn has a post office with ZIP code 23066.

References

Census-designated places in Mathews County, Virginia
Census-designated places in Virginia
Virginia populated places on the Chesapeake Bay